UPMC Harrisburg is a 409-bed urban hospital in Harrisburg, Pennsylvania and part of the University of Pittsburgh Medical Center (UPMC) system. The hospital serves as the hub for the UPMC network, providing advanced care to the residents throughout southcentral Pennsylvania.

UPMC Harrisburg features:

• A state-of-the-art Labor and Delivery area with a Level III Neonatal Intensive Care Unit.

• World-class cardiology care through UPMC Heart and Vascular Institute.

• The region’s premier kidney transplant center.

• Advanced pediatric care with UPMC Children’s Harrisburg in partnership with nationally recognized UPMC Children’s Hospital of Pittsburgh.

• Leading-edge care in neurosciences, women’s care, comprehensive stroke care, and more.

This campus is also home to the Alex Grass Medical Sciences Building, which includes:

• Bone, Joint, and Spine Institutes

• Laboratory services

• Maternal Fetal Medicine

• Select Medical rehab services

UPMC Harrisburg has earned the Magnet® designation.

The hospital is a teaching facility providing comprehensive inpatient and outpatient services. Specialties include women's health, cardiovascular care and orthopedic, stroke, and rehabilitative services. Physician residency programs exist on-site for family practice, internal medicine, emergency medicine, obstetrics and gynecology, orthopaedic surgery, and general surgery.

In November 2020 UPMC announced the opening of the new pediatric unit at UPMC Harrisburg. The new unit was opened in partnership with the UPMC Children's Hospital of Pittsburgh and consist of 26-pediatric-beds. The unit treats infants, children, teens, and young adults age 0-21. The unit is named "UPMC Children’s Harrisburg" and features telemedicine connections to the main hospital in Pittsburgh.

In May 2021 UPMC announced the renaming of UPMC Pinnacle Harrisburg to UPMC Harrisburg, effective May 24.

See also
List of hospitals in Harrisburg

References

External links

Hospitals in Harrisburg, Pennsylvania

Hospitals in Pennsylvania
University of Pittsburgh Medical Center
University of Pittsburgh
Teaching hospitals in Pennsylvania